Chamaemeles is a monotypic genus of flowering plants in the family Rosaceae. Its only species, Chamaemeles coriacea, is endemic to Madeira.

References

Maleae
Monotypic Rosaceae genera
Endemic flora of Madeira